The Texas Tornado were a Junior A hockey team located in Frisco, Texas, USA. The team joined the North American Hockey League's Central division in 1999 (and moved into the newly formed southern division three years later) while located in North Richland Hills, Texas, and enjoyed unprecedented success since their expansion year.

The Tornado played their home games at the 6,000-seat Dr Pepper Arena in Frisco.

On May 13, 2006, the Tornado won their third straight Robertson Cup by defeating the Bozeman Icedogs. This accomplishment would be the first time in over 15 years that a team won three consecutive Robertson Cups. On May 8, 2012, the Tornado won their 5th Robertson Cup in team history by defeating the St. Louis Bandits 4-3 in overtime. The Tornado were owned and operated by the Consolidated Sports Holdings USA, Inc. In the 2013 offseason, the Tornado were sold to Texas Hockey Partners (THP) and relocated back to North Richland Hills becoming the Lone Star Brahmas.

Season records

Tornado alumni in the NHL
The Tornado were equally successful in preparing players for the next level of hockey. Especially of note are the goaltenders to come out of the system. The more notable players include -

 Stephane Da Costa, F, Ottawa Senators
Al Montoya, G, Montreal Canadiens
Ben Bishop, G, Dallas Stars
Dave McKee, G, Anaheim Ducks
Andy Wozniewski, D, Toronto Maple Leafs
Matt Nickerson, D, Dallas Stars
Jake Newton, D, Anaheim Ducks

References

External links 
Texas Tornado Hockey
Ticket information
Official League site

Defunct North American Hockey League teams
Ice hockey teams in Texas
Ice hockey teams in the Dallas–Fort Worth metroplex
Ice hockey clubs established in 1999
Ice hockey clubs disestablished in 2013
Sports in Frisco, Texas
1999 establishments in Texas
2013 disestablishments in Texas